A list of films released in Japan in 1978 (see 1978 in film).

See also
1978 in Japan
1978 in Japanese television

External links
 Japanese films of 1978 at the Internet Movie Database

1978
Lists of 1978 films by country or language
Films